Ruden Sada Lepcha is an Indian politician from Bharatiya Gorkha Prajatantrik Morcha. In May 2021, he was elected as a member of the West Bengal Legislative Assembly from Kalimpong (constituency) as a candidate of Gorkha Janmukti Morcha (Tamang). He defeated Suva Pradhan of Bharatiya Janata Party by 3,870 votes in 2021 West Bengal Assembly Elections.

Criminal Records

He is an accused in a number of criminal cases, including criminal intimidation and kidnapping with intent to murder. However, he hasn't been convicted in any form so far.

References 

Living people
Year of birth missing (living people)
21st-century Indian politicians
People from Kalimpong district
Gorkha Janmukti Morcha politicians
West Bengal MLAs 2021–2026
Indian Gorkhas
Lepcha people